England at the 2002 Commonwealth Games was represented by the Commonwealth Games Council for England (CGCE).

England joined the Commonwealth of Nations as part of the United Kingdom in 1931.

The team that attended the games in Manchester was the largest fielded up to that point, comprising 444 competitors and 221 officials.

Medals

Gold
Athletics:
Steve Backley, men's javelin
Michael East, men's 1500 m
Jonathan Edwards, men's triple jump
Ashia Hansen, women's triple jump
Kelly Holmes, women's 1500 m
Michael Jones, men's hammer throw
Nathan Morgan, men's long jump
Paula Radcliffe, women's 5000 m
Chris Rawlinson, 400 m hurdles
Lorraine Shaw, women's hammer throw
Darren Campbell, Allyn Condon, Marlon Devonish & Jason Gardener, men's 4x100 m relay
Sean Baldock, Daniel Caines, Jared Deacon, Chris Rawlinson, men's 4x400 m relay

Badminton:
Simon Archer & Joanne Goode, mixed doubles
James Anderson, Simon Archer, Robert Blair, Anthony Clark, Mark Constable, Gail Emms, Joanne Goode, Tracey Hallam, Colin Haughton, Donna Kellogg, Julia Mann, Ella Miles, Nathan Robertson & Sara Sankey, team

Boxing:
Darren Barker, light welterweight 63.5 kg
David Dolan, super heavyweight 81 kg

Diving:
Peter Waterfield, men's 10 m platform

Gymnastics:
Kanukai Jackson, men's individual all-around
Beth Tweddle, women's uneven bars
Ross Brewer, Craig Heap, Kanukai Jackson, John Smethurst, Cuong Thoong, men's team all-around

Judo:
Simone Callender, women's 78kg+
Craig Fallon, men's 60 kg
Winston Gordon, men's 90 kg
Warren James, men's 66 kg
Samantha Lowe, women's 70 kg
Karen Roberts, women's 63 kg
Michelle Rogers, women's 78 kg
Georgina Singleton, women's 52 kg

Lawn bowls:
Ruth Small, women's blind
David Holt, Robert Newman, John Ottaway & Simon Skelton, men's fours
Ellen Alexander, Carol Duckworth, Gill Mitchell & Shirley Page, women's fours

Shooting:
Mick Gault, men's 10 m air pistol
Mick Gault, men's 50 m pistol
Charlotte Kerwood, women's double trap
Nicholas Baxter & Mick Gault, men's 10 m air pistol pairs
Mike Babb & Neil Day, men's 50 m rifle prone pairs

Squash:
Lee Beachill & Peter Nicol, men's doubles

Swimming:
Zoë Baker, women's 50 m breaststroke
Rebecca Cooke, women's 400 m freestyle
Rebecca Cooke, women's 800 m freestyle
James Gibson, men's 50 m breaststroke
James Goddard, men's 200 m backstroke
Karen Pickering, women's 200 m freestyle
Sarah Price, women's 100 m backstroke
Sarah Price, women's 200 m backstroke
Adam Whitehead, men's 100 m breaststroke
Jo Fargus, Georgina Lee, Karen Legg & Karen Pickering, women's 4x200 freestyle relay

Table tennis:
Sue Gilroy, women's singles EAD
Andrew Baggaley & Gareth Herbert, men's doubles
Andrew Baggaley, Alex Parry, Matthew Syed, Terry Young & Gareth Herbert, men's team

Weightlifting:
Giles Greenwood, men's +105 kg snatch
Delroy McQueen, men's 105 kg snatch
Delroy McQueen, men's 105 kg clean and jerk
Delroy McQueen, men's 105 kg overall

Silver
Athletics:
Marlon Devonish, men's 200 m
Phillips Idowu, men's triple jump
Jade Johnson, women's long jump
Susan Jones, women's high jump
Lisa Kehler, women's 20 km walk
Helen Frost, Helen Karagounis, Lisa Miller & Melanie Purkiss, women's 4x400 m relay

Badminton:
Tracey Hallam, women's singles

Boxing:
Steven Birch, middleweight 75 kg
Darren Langley, light flyweight 48 kg
Paul Smith, light middleweight 71 kg

Cycling:
Julie Paulding, women's 500 m time trial
Jason Queally, men's 1000 m time trial
Bradley Wiggins, men's 4000 m individual pursuit
Paul Manning, Chris Newton, Bryan Steel & Bradley Wiggins, men's 4000 m team pursuit
Jason Queally, Andy Slater & Jamie Staff, men's 750 m team sprint

Diving:
Tony Ally, men's 1 m springboard
Tony Ally, men's 3 m springboard
Leon Taylor, men's 10 m platform

Gymnastics:
Kanukai Jackson, men's pommel horse
Kanukai Jackson, men's vault
Beth Owen, women's floor
Beth Tweddle, women's individual all-around
Katy Lennon, Lizzy Line, Becky Owen, Beth Tweddle & Nicola Willis, women's team all-around

Hockey:
Anna Bennett, Jennie Bimson, Sarah Blanks, Melanie Clewlow, Joanne Ellis, Helen Grant, Frances Houslop, Leisa King, Mandy Nicholson, Carolyn Reid, Helen Richardson, Hilary Rose, Jane Smith, Rachel Walker, Kate Walsh & Lucilla Wright, women's hockey

Judo:
Thomas Cousins, men's 81 kg
Sam Delahay, men's 100 kg
Clare Lynch, women's 48 kg
Daniel Sargent, men's +100 kg

Lawn bowls:
Stephen Farish & Dean Morgan, men's pairs

Shooting:
Mike Babb, men's 50 m rifle prone
Anita North, women's trap
Jason Burrage & Chris Hector, men's 50 m rifle 3 positions pairs
Christopher Dean & Ian Peel, men's trap pairs
Lesley Goddard & Anita North, women's trap pairs

Note: Due to there only being three pairs of competitors in the women's skeet pairs, only the gold medal was awarded. So whilst the pairing of Susan Bramley & Pinky le Grelle did finish in second, they did not receive the silver medal.

Squash:
Peter Nicol, men's singles
Tania Bailey & Cassie Jackman, women's doubles

Swimming:
Jo Fargus, women's 200 m backstroke
Georgina Lee, women's 200 m butterfly
Karen Legg, women's 200 m freestyle
Stephen Parry, men's 200 m butterfly
Adrian Turner, men's 200 m individual medley
Adam Whitehead, men's 50 m breaststroke
James Hickman, Matt Kidd, Adam Ruckwood & Adam Whitehead, men's 4x100 m medley relay
Rosalind Brett, Karen Legg, Melanie Marshall & Karen Pickering, women's 4x100 m freestyle relay

Synchronised swimming:
Gayle Adamson, synchronised swimming solo
Gayle Adamson & Katie Hooper, synchronised swimming duet

Weightlifting:
Anthony Arthur, men's 85 kg combined
Anthony Arthur, men's 85 kg snatch
Giles Greenwood, men's +105 kg combined
David Guest, men's 94 kg combined
David Guest, men's 94 kg snatch

Bronze
Athletics:
Darren Campbell, men's 200 m
Ben Challenger, men's high jump
Paul Head, men's hammer throw
Irie Hill, women's pole vault
Kelly Morgan, women's javelin
Carl Myerscough, men's shot put
Shelley Newman, women's discus
Nick Nieland, men's javelin
Helen Pattinson, women's 1500 m
Bob Weir, men's discus
Shani Anderson, Vernicha James, Joice Maduaka & Abi Oyepitan, women's 4x100 m relay

Badminton:
James Anderson & Simon Archer, men's doubles (with Clark and Robertson, no third-place play-off)
Anthony Clark & Nathan Robertson, men's doubles (with Anderson and Archer, no third-place play-off)
Anthony Clark & Sara Sankey, mixed doubles
Gail Emms & Joanne Goode, women's doubles

Boxing:
Mark Moran, bantamweight 54 kg
Andy Morris, lightweight 60 kg

Cycling:
Tony Gibb, men's 20 km scratch race
Rachel Heal, women's road race
Liam Killeen, men's cross country
Paul Manning, men's 4000 m individual pursuit
Chris Newton, men's points race
Jamie Staff, men's 1000 m time trial

Diving:
Jane Smith, women's 1 m springboard
Jane Smith, women's 3 m springboard

Gymnastics:
John Smethurst, men's parallel bars

Judo:
Sophie Cox, women's 57 kg

Lawn bowls:
Amy Gowshall & Lynne Whitehead, women's pairs

Shooting:
Mick Gault, men's 25 m standard pistol
Louise Minett, women's 10 m air rifle
Chris Hector & Nigel Wallace, men's 10 m air rifle pairs
John Bellamy & Richard Faulds, men's double trap pairs
Richard Brickell & Drew Harvey, men's skeet pairs
Glyn Barnett & Jane Messer, open full bore rifle pairs
Victoria Eaton & Louise Minett, women's 10 m air rifle pairs
Linda Smallbone & Helen Vincent, women's 50 m rifle prone pairs

Squash:
Cassie Jackman, women's singles
Mark Chaloner & Paul Johnson, men's doubles
Fiona Geaves & Chris Walker, mixed doubles
Linda Charman & Fiona Geaves, women's doubles

Swimming:
Mark Foster, men's 50 m butterfly
Mark Foster, men's 50 m freestyle
James Gibson, men's 100 m breaststroke
James Goddard, men's 200 m individual medley
James Hickman, men's 200 m butterfly
Karen Legg, women's 100 m freestyle
Darren Mew, men's 50 m breaststroke
Simon Militis, men's 200 m backstroke
Margaretha Pedder, women's 200 m butterfly
Sarah Price, women's 50 m backstroke
Katy Sexton, women's 200 m backstroke
Adrian Turner, men's 400 m individual medley
Simon Burnett, Adam Faulkner, Stephen Parry & James Salter, men's 4x200 m freestyle relay
Kate Haywood, Georgina Lee, Karen Legg & Sarah Price, women's 4x100 m medley relay

Table tennis:
Cathy Mitton, women's singles EAD

Weightlifting:
Anthony Arthur, men's 85 kg clean and jerk
Gurbinder Cheema, men's 105 kg snatch
Stewart Cruickshank, men's 96 kg combined
Karl Grant, men's 94 kg clean and jerk
Giles Greenwood, men's 105 kg clean and jerk

See also 
 England at the Commonwealth Games

References

External links
 Official site

2002
2002 in English sport
Nations at the 2002 Commonwealth Games